Sepia ivanovi is a species of cuttlefish native to the southwestern Indian Ocean, probably throughout southeast Africa, including Kenya, Mozambique, to the mouth of the Zambezi River. It lives at depths to 50 m.

Sepia ivanovi grows to a mantle length of 70 mm.

The type specimen was collected near Mombasa, Kenya. It is deposited at the Zoological Museum in Moscow.

References

External links

Cuttlefish
Molluscs described in 1982